Wrenn School is a coeducational secondary comprehensive school and Sixth form with academy status, located in Wellingborough, Northamptonshire, England.

History
The school's origins lie in Wellingborough County High School for girls (1907) and Wellingborough Grammar School for boys (1930). The Wellingborough County High School was founded in 1907, and moved into the Broadway site in 1911, and the grammar school site was finished in 1930, on Doddington Road. The two schools merged in 1975, under the then headmaster, Mr Wrenn, to form Wrenn School.

Facilities
Wrenn School is a split-site school, with the three parts of its grounds being a short walk apart. The first site of the school is situated on the A5193 (former A509) in the south of the town, just west of the hospital, on London Road and Broadway  The other two sites are situated on Doddington Road  a few minutes from the London Road site. The Doddington Road site, formerly the boys' grammar school, houses years 9-11 along with the Art and Design Technology buildings, and the Roseacre Playing Fields site, for Physical Education, is situated directly opposite the main Doddington Road building. The London Road site, which was the site of the former girls' high school, is attended by years 7-8 and the school's Sixth Form. The oldest buildings are those of the former grammar school, and the most modern additions are the all-weather pitch (AstroTurf) and pavilion, constructed in 2004 and the music block, constructed in 2006.

Inspection judgements and academisation

 1993: the school became a Grant Maintained School
 2004: the school became a Specialist Science College
 2009: the school's Sixth Form was rated Outstanding by OFSTED
 2013: the school became an Academy, as part of 'The Education Fellowship Trust' .
 2015: judgement of Requires Improvement.
 2016: judgement of Inadequate.
 2017: the Department for Education issued a Termination Notice to the Education Fellowship Trust in January 2017, stating that the Regional Schools Commissioner was considering terminating the academy's funding agreement. This was then confirmed in March 2017.
 2018: judgement of Good.
 2018: the school was transferred to the 'Creative Education Trust'.

Academic performance

In 2018, the school's Progress 8 score at GCSE was average, and its Attainment 8 score below average.

Wellingborough Music & Arts Centre
The Northamptonshire County Council-run “Music and Arts Centre” takes place every Saturday morning in the Wrenn School, at the London Road site, and the festival band has achieved national recognition in the finals of the national festival of music for youth.

Notable people

Wrenn School
 Ashleigh Butler, Entertainer and Britain's Got Talent 2012 winner along with Pudsey the Dog

Wellingborough Grammar School
 Gerry Bermingham, Labour MP from 1983-2001 for St Helens South
 Richard Bradshaw, Director from 1998-2007 of the Canadian Opera Company
 Michael Cox (novelist)
 Sir David Frost OBE
 Sir Bruce Liddington
 Giovanni Di Stefano - fraudster
 Sir Terence Streeton KBE CMG, High Commissioner to Bangladesh from 1983-9
 David Thacker, theatre director
 Don White (footballer), rugby player and English national coach from 1969–71

Former teachers
Jeff Butterfield - England and Northampton rugby player
Bob Taylor - England rugby player

References

External links

 Wellingborough High School Old Girls Association (website)
 Wellingborough High School (book website)

Wellingborough
Educational institutions established in 1975
Secondary schools in North Northamptonshire
1975 establishments in England
Academies in North Northamptonshire